Whitlatch is a surname. Notable people with the surname include:

Blake Whitlatch (born 1955), American football player
Luke Whitlatch (born 1977), American artist
Terryl Whitlatch (born 1960), American illustrator